This is a list of songs about County Clare, Ireland. 

 "Adventures of an Amorous Tailor" -  written by Miko Guthrie.
 "The Ambush at Rineen" - about the Rineen ambush carried out by the Irish Republican Army (IRA) on 22 September 1920, during the Irish War of Independence.
 "Are Ye Right There Michael?" - about the West Clare Railway, written by Percy French.
 "The Banner Dream" - written by Pat Cooksey
 "The Banner Roar" - composed after Clare won the Munster hurling championship in 1995
 "The Cattle Drive of Doolin"
 "Clahane Doimhin"
 "Crowe’s Bridge"
 "The Cliffs of Moher" - by Dermot Kelly
 "The Darlin' Girl from Clare" - by Percy French
 "Ennistymon, The Town of the Cascades"
 "Ennistymon in the County Clare" - written by Fr. Cawley, curate in the parish at the time and a local man, Michael Clair 
 "The Famous Faha Sports" - song about a local sports day, written by Miko Guthrie with extra verses added by Breandán Higgins of Lahinch. Recorded by Shaskeen and Sean O'Sé with The Turloughmore Céilí Band
 "The Five Pilots Of Kilbaha" - about the village of Kilbaha.
 "Farewell To Lissycasey" - about the village of Lissycasey. 
 "From Clare to Here" - written by Ralph McTell and recorded by The Fureys
 "The Green Hills of Clare" - a traditional song
 "My Heart's Tonight In Ireland (In The Sweet County Clare)" - written and recorded by Andy Irvine
 "The Hillside of Beenvane" -  written by Miko Guthrie. 
 "The Iron Men from Quilty" - describing the rescue by Quilty fishermen of the crew of a stricken French ship.
 "Lisdoonvarna" - written and recorded by Christy Moore
 “Lone Shanakyle” - written by Thomas Madigan, recorded by Dervish and others
 "Mac and Shanahan" - a West Clare song about Willie Shanahan of Ocean View, Doughmore, and Captain Michael MacNamara of the Doonbeg Company who were tortured and killed by British forces in 1920. Recorded by Tim Dennehy. 
 "The Music And County Clare" - by P. J. Murrihy
 "My Lovely Rose of Clare" - recorded by Paddy Reilly and Foster and Allen, among others.
 "The Rambler from Clare"
 "The Scarriff Martyrs" - about four young men shot by Auxiliaries on Killaloe Bridge on 16 November 1920.
 "Seán a Flop’s Dance"
 “The Shades of Gloria” - by Gerry O'Beirne, recorded by Maura O'Connell and others
 "Spancil Hill, a ballad composed by Michael Considine (1850–73), of a man who longs for his home in Spancill Hill, County Clare. 
 "Tadhg O hEaghráin" - written by Tadhg O hEaghráin himself in the 1950s.
 "The Trial of P. Arkins" - attributed to Mrs Nora Considine (née Murphy), Kilshanny (1903).
 "We Were There" - written by Pat Cooksey
 "The West Coast Of Clare" - by Andy Irvine Donal Lunny

See also
 Music of Ireland

References

Irish ballads
 
Irish styles of music
Clare
Clare